Anolis ginaelisae is a species of lizard in the family Dactyloidae. The species is found in Panama.

References

Anoles
Endemic fauna of Panama
Reptiles of Panama
Reptiles described in 2013
Taxa named by Gunther Köhler